AA 7039 is an aluminum alloy principally containing zinc (3.5–4.5%) as an alloying element.  It is heat treatable wrought aluminum alloy.  It is used for making armour suites.

Chemical Composition

Physical Properties

Mechanical Properties

For more properties, visit 

 http://www.matweb.com/search/datasheet_print.aspx?matguid=e4e262e692284ac994651fe1e268322c
 http://www.matweb.com/search/datasheettext.aspx?matguid=67426fbb5e0d4ee6be7c0fb99cc4c756

Applications 
Aluminium / aluminum 7039 alloy is chiefly used as an armor alloy. It is used for making armor suite.

References

Further reading
 "Properties of Wrought Aluminum and Aluminum Alloys: 7039", Properties and Selection: Nonferrous Alloys and Special-Purpose Materials, Vol 2, ASM Handbook, ASM International, 1990, p. 109-111. 
Mechanical and ballistic properties of powder metal 7039 aluminium alloy joined by friction stir welding

Aluminum alloy table 

Aluminium–zinc alloys